Rok 1863 is a Polish historical film. It was released in 1922.

Cast 

 Aleksander Zelwerowicz - Aleksander Wielopolski
 Ryszard Sobiszewski - Książę Odrowąż
 Stanisława Chrzanowska - Księżna Odrowążyna
 Antoni Bednarczyk - Rudecki
 Helena Marcello-Palińska - Rudecka
 Maria Hryniewicz - Salomea Brynicka
 Stanisław Hryniewicz - Antoni Brynicki
 Kazimierz Lasocki - Szczepan
 Mieczysław Gielniewski 
 Henryk Rydzewski

References

External links
 

1922 films
Films based on works by Stefan Żeromski
Polish historical films
1920s Polish-language films
Polish silent feature films
Polish black-and-white films
1920s historical films